Undri may refer to:

Undrið FF, a Faroese football team
Urdu, an alternate name for Undri
Undri, a neighborhood in Pune, Maharashtra, India